

The European Universities Debating Championships (EUDC) is an annual debating tournament for teams from universities in Europe. The competition uses the British Parliamentary Debate format (the same debate format used at the World Universities Debating Championship).

The championships as they are known today were first held in Rotterdam, Netherlands at Erasmus University from 8–11 April 1999. Subsequent tournaments were held at a similar time of year until Koc EUDC in 2007 when the tournament shifted to the late summer in order to accommodate all university examination periods across the continent. The competition has also become longer to accommodate the growth of the event.

The competition in 1999 involved 32 teams of two speakers, but has now grown to involve up to 200 teams each year. Institutions can enter more than one team based on the ability of the organisers to accommodate them. Some institutions also enter teams from more than one separate debating societies within their institution.

Participating teams are drawn principally from European tertiary education institutions, although teams from the Middle East and central Asian institutions are eligible pending the formation of similar competitions in their regions. Students at the Inns of Court are also eligible subject to some conditions.

Current Champions

The 2022 European Champions in the Open category are Jack Palmer and Dylan McCarthy from the University Philosophical Society at Trinity College Dublin.  

The 2022 European Champions in the English as a Second Language category are Hadar Goldberg and Tamar Ben Meir from Tel Aviv University.

Championships 

These are the institutions (universities or debating bodies) that have hosted or will host the European Universities Debating Championships.

EUDC Council and EUDC Committee 

In 1999, the EUDC Council was formed as the highest decision making organ. Every competing nation has one vote. The council sits during the tournament.  It decides on the constitution, criteria regarding eligibility issues, and about the hosts of future championships.

The EUDC Committee consist of a president, who also chairs the council, a secretary, a registrar, the hosts of the current tournament and the past tournament and regional representatives for central and eastern Europe, for Northern and Western Europe, South-East Europe, the middle east and the Islands of the North Atlantic.

Minutes of EUDC Council and the Constitution are published on the EUDC Council Website.

The current chair of council and president of the committee is Miruna Chirila from University College London Debating in the United Kingdom.

See also 
 World Universities Debating Championship

References

External links 
 Official Site of the 2010 Championship in Amsterdam
 Official Site of EUDC Council
 Debate website with past results and motions from EUDC and future announcements
 Official Site of the 2012 Championship in Belgrade
 Official Site of the 2016 Championship in Warsaw

European debating competitions
Debating